Gundam models, or , are model kits depicting the vehicles and characters of the fictional Gundam multiverse by Bandai.

These kits became popular among mecha anime fans and model enthusiasts in Japan and nearby Asian countries beginning in the 1980s. Gundam modeling spread in the 1990s with North America and Europe being exposed to Gundam through television, video and manga.

The name Gunpla derives from the phrase "Gundam plastic model," most kits being made of plastic.

Bandai sold over  Gundam plastic model units between 1980 and 1984, and over  units by May 1999. By 2015, Bandai had sold an estimated 450million units worldwide across nearly 2,000 different Gundam models. , Bandai Namco has sold  Gundam plastic model units, including  standard Gundam units (since 1980) and  SD Gundam units (since 1987).

History
Late 1970s–1980s
Gundam models are based on the Mobile Suit Gundam franchise, which debuted in 1979 as a television show. The show was not highly successful, and the toys produced by Clover did not sell well.

In 1980, Bandai obtained the rights to produce models based on the Gundam franchise. While Clover's models were produced in the style of most children's toys - fully assembled and ready for play - Bandai designed theirs as plastic kits to be assembled, similar to military vehicle models. While Clover's products targeted children, Bandai's approach was more appealing to the teenage and adult consumers that were more typical of Mobile Suit Gundam's audience, and was received extremely well.

Nearly every mecha in the series was made into a model kit, from mobile suits to support aircraft and space battleships. Parts came in up to three different cast-in colors. These early kits are distinguished by their lack of articulation and low detail and, unlike later generations, require glue to assemble.

A later development was System Injection, a technique which permitted a single "part" to be cast in multiple colors of plastic simultaneously, minimizing the need to paint the finished model.

Mid 1980s–1990s
In 1985, Bandai introduced poly-caps (soft plastic, typically Polyethylene) as connectors for better articulation of joints.

The 1987 Gundam Sentinel model line introduced snap-fit models, which needed little or no glue to assemble. This would become standard in 1988, after which all kits use snap-fit assembly and no glue is needed.

In 1990, Bandai introduced the High Grade (HG) line, which began an ongoing process of increasing model quality, and the creation of a grade system to describe the detail and quality of each kit. HG kits boasted much higher detail and articulation, as well as features normally found in larger-scale models, despite being 1:144 scale. One example is the Gundam Core Block System, in which the pilot sits in a "Core" which can be removed from the Gundam to become a distinct vehicle, and the Zeta Gundam's transformation feature.

In 1993, a unified set of poly-cap joints was created for smaller scale models that allowed easy mass production of models that all shared the same basic skeletal frame. This standardization allowed Bandai to release more models over a shorter period. As a result, the Gundam shows of the 1990s usually received sizable 1:144 model lines.

In 1995, the 1:100 Master Grade (MG) line was introduced. This line featured more parts, better detail and improved articulation than past kits of the same scale.

In 1998, Bandai introduced the 1:60 Perfect Grade (PG) line. This line features extensive detail and articulation, light-up features, and a "body on frame" skeletal system in which the exterior panels of the model are separate components attached to a completely functional, articulated internal frame. This design element would later appear (sometimes in a limited form) in lower-grade models. The PG line is typically the most expensive among all Gunpla kits, and only a select few mobile suits have been released in this line.

In 1999, to celebrate the 20th anniversary of the franchise, Bandai released 1:144 First Grade (FG) kits of mobile suits from the original series. Marketed as budget models, these snap-fit kits featured the simplicity of the original kits, but with more modern designs based upon the corresponding Perfect Grade kits.

2000s
Mobile Suit Gundam SEED introduced a new type of non-graded (NG) 1:144 model, with a completely different design plan. While these still feature snap-fit and color molding, they omit major joints, opting instead to only allow critical pieces to move—typically the neck, hips, shoulders, and feet. These are budget models, usually retailing much lower than other models; and this line was extensive, covering nearly every machine to be featured in the TV series.

Gundam SEED also featured non graded 1:100 models, identical in quality to Bandai's High Grade offerings.

It was also during this decade that the term "Gunpla" was coined by Bandai.

2010s
In 2010, Bandai released the 1:48 Mega Size Model RX-78-2 Gundam kit as part of the franchise's 30th anniversary campaign. This kit features many innovations that make it easy to assemble for first-time Gunpla collectors. For example, the parts are attached to sprue gates thin enough to break without the need to use of plastic cutters, and excess gate plastic can be removed from the parts without using a hobby knife. Some sprues have been designed to snap together for easy and quick removal of assembled parts.

In the same year, Bandai introduced the 1:144 Real Grade (RG) line, which takes design elements from the MG line such as an inner skeletal frame.

Both Mega Size Model and RG variants of the RX-78-2 Gundam were patterned after the 1/1 scale Gundam statue on display in Odaiba. Bandai also released Ecopla, a series of HGUC and SD kits molded in black and made entirely out of recycled sprues.

In 2011, Bandai released the Entry Grade (EG) line, a low-cost model series similar to the 1:144 NG and FG lines, sold only in parts of Asia. Unlike other kits of the same scale, the first line of EG kits were made in China and the series was initially discontinued until the line was rebooted in 2020 with kits from non-Gundam franchises.

Also in 2011, Bandai introduced the Advanced Grade (AG) line, a budget line that focuses more on the arrangement of colored parts, thus sacrificing more articulation than the previous budget lines. The AG line incorporates a microchip that enables collectors to use the kit in the Gage-ing arcade game.

In 2014, as part of the 35th anniversary celebration of Gundam, Bandai released the MG RX-78-2 Gundam ver. 3.0, which incorporates the engineering techniques used in the MG 2.0 and RG kits.

In 2015, Bandai introduced a sub-line of the HG called "HG Revive", which consists of re-engineered 1:144 scale kits of the RX-78-2 Gundam and other classic mobile suit designs.

From late 2016 onwards, every Bandai produced model kit, including Gunpla, were made with English and Japanese on the box and manuals.

In 2017, Bandai began the Gundam Evolution project, which sought to improve Gunpla technology with various groundbreaking kits, such as the adoption of a new joint system, or a new LED system for large-scale kits. This was to prepare for the 40th anniversary of Gunpla in 2020.

Assembly 

Gundam model kits come in many varieties, but the majority made from the late 80s on - standard "plastic" kits - are manufactured and assembled similarly. Kits come as a collection of plastic parts, decals, and sometimes other decorative accessories which the purchaser assembles by hand into the finished model. The plastic parts are delivered in the exact form they exit the injection molding machine, on a "sprue tree" - a grid of interconnecting plastic rods, called runners, created by the channels in the mold that carried the molten plastic into the cavities that create each part. Each part is connected to the runners by a small plastic nub called a "gate" where the runner connected to the cavity.

The kit builder must cut away this excess plastic - usually with a pair of side cutting pliers - to free each part, then (optionally, but usually) clip, carve or sand away the remaining plastic tip where the gates attached to leave a clean surface.

Once the parts have been freed, the builder must then snap them together to assemble the model. Early kits required glue, but from the late 80s onward all kits assemble without special tools or materials.

Some kits use an internal frame - a complete "skeleton," fully articulated and able to stand on its own - to which panels are then attached to finish the appearance of the mecha.

When it comes time to assemble the panels making up the external appearance of the model, the builder may choose to customize the model in a wide variety of ways. The most basic is simply to paint the model, which allows for a large amount of personal creativity. Applying decals is also a common technique - decals are included with most models, but are also available as separate products for customization.

Every conceivable modification is possible, with some more common options including:

 Panel lining: Many models have grooves where "panels" meet. Applying paint or ink with a fine tipped brush or pen can make these lines "pop"
 Panel line scribing: If the panel lines on a model are not as deep as the builder would like, they can use a knife to deepen them, or create new ones, using a ruler or custom stencil.
 Weathering: A variety of paint and plastic etching and carving techniques can make the model appear worn or battle-damaged, exposing simulated metal beneath the surface of an actual mobile suit's paint.
 Kitbashing: Kitbashes combine parts from multiple kits to create a unique new model. This technique has been used by employees at Hasbro to create prototypes of planned releases.
 Conversion kits: Conversion kits are (often) third-party products, usually made of thermoset resin, which can be attached (usually glued) to an official Bandai model to convert it into another model using the original as a base. Bandai used to release official conversion kits under the brand name B-Club. 
 Custom parts: At the extreme end, a skilled builder can create additional parts completely from scratch to add detail to the model. these can be purely aesthetic, enhance the articulation of a model, or introduce new gimmicks to a kit.

All of these are optional, and the model can be assembled and displayed using nothing more than a side-cutter.

Most models, once assembled, are poseable to some degree. Many are "fully poseable," with a wide latitude of motion. To help hold models in "dynamic" poses, gunpla can be mounted on a stand, with some recent models having a dedicated attachment point for this purpose.

Design 

Over the decades, Gundam plastic models have been available in many forms, with many levels of intricacy and functionality, from immobile display units that are static once assembled, to fully poseable, highly articulated models with interchangeable parts (weapons, shields, etc.) and complex mechanical engineering.

All parts fit together with a variety of glueless, toolless joints, such as ball-and-socket pivots, or posts on one component that fit tightly into holes on another. While models are designed to be posed for display, these joints are not intended to hold up to action figure-style play; even during gentle pose adjustments, it is possible for parts to come loose and need to be pushed back together.

Components are made of plastic materials selected to fit the needs of each part. A given unit, like a foot or leg, may use parts made of multiple different materials. Bandai casts colored pigment into each part to provide a basic color scheme for the finished model, so the builder does not need to paint it if undesired.

The picture above illustrates the detail level of a higher end (Real Grade, 2011) model. This is one part of the model's "foot", less than an inch across, which not only has many details in a very small component, but is built around a very small doubly-articulated hinge. The fully assembled leg unit uses many more parts which allow it to bend at two major joints, and also has trim panels which slide apart as the leg is bent to allow the motion.

Materials
Gundam model kits can be made of several materials.

Plastic 
The typical mass-market kit is made from thermoplastics, such as ABS, polypropylene or polystyrene. These are referred to in the community simply as "plastic" models, and use the snap-fit assembly method described in this article.

Plastic Gundam model kits are manufactured in Japan or China by Bandai, which has an exclusive license in manufacturing and marketing them around the world.

Resin
A less common type, known as a garage kit or resin kit, is made from a thermoset resin, typically polyurethane, often simply referred to as "resin." These are not assembled with the snap-fit approach, and the builder must assemble them with glue. Many other assertions of this article will also not apply to resin kits, since they make up a very small minority of the product line.

Garage kits were originally made by amateur or small-scale manufacturers (hence the name,) a cottage industry that predates gunpla, but Bandai has released some first-party Gundam resin kits under a separate marque, B-Club. These models are made of unpainted resin with no decals provided and often require touch-up work by the builder due to the inherent limitations of the manufacturing process.

While comparably more expensive (some surpassing $400) and more complex to assemble compared to plastic kits, they offer higher detail for the dedicated and experienced model builder.

Non-plastic 
A few select kits have also been manufactured from metal. These kits are offered by several different manufacturers and most commonly will result in a finished model of about MG level. These types of models usually take days to build.

Scale
As with hobby models based on real-world military equipment, Gundam models are intended to be "scaled down" replicas of realistic designs, based on the dimensions given in the fiction. These scales are given in terms of the ratio of actual model size to the size the machine would have if it were actually built. 1:60, for instance, means that every inch of the models height is equivalent to 60 inches of the machines height if it was real.

Generally, kits range from 4~5 inches for small-scale models, 6~8 inches for mid-scale models, and 12 inches for large-scale models. Common scales, and the grades (discussed in the next section) typically associated with them, include:

Grades 
Bandai uses a convention called grade to describe generally how detailed a given model is. Many models are available in multiple grades, depicting the same fictional machine with the same general appearance, but with different levels of part detail. A High Grade (or HG) model for instance will have noticeably less detail than a Master Grade (or MG.) The models are also different sizes, with the HG being about two inches shorter than the MG.

Most models within a grade are the same scale, to the point that grade is often used as shorthand for both, though this is not consistent. For instance, "Perfect Grade" models are typically 1:60 scale, and "High Grade" typically 1:144, but there are "High Grade" models that are 1:60, yet have inferior detail to a 1:60 "Perfect Grade," and vice versa.

Grades have no specific definition, but generally improve in quality over time. A more recent re-release of a High Grade model may be superior to the same model from several years prior, so grade alone does not entirely define the quality of a model.

For instance, the RX-78 has been released several times as an HG model, with each one having more intricate detail than the last, yet each release is considered HG. Likewise, a PG model from several years ago may look better than an HG model from today.

The following sections will cover in detail each of the common grades, roughly in order of "quality," defined as the general detail level and intricacy compared to other models in the same grade at the same time.

Original / No Grade / First Grade (FG) (various scales) 
The original 1980 line of Gundam models does not have an associated grade, since this terminology was not introduced until 1990. These kits are limited in articulation, some require glue to assemble, and they must be painted for a correct appearance. Model Kits released to coincide with a show or movie usually that did not have a grade associated with them are generally referred to as No Grade kits. These were released in 1/144, 1/100, or 1/60 scale (some 1/100 models used the High Grade name on their boxes).

After the adoption of the grade nomenclature, Bandai rereleased the designs of the RX-78-2 and Zaku II with minimal updates as First Grade (FG) starting in 1999. Four mobile suits from Gundam 00 were also given First Grade Models, with limited color separation.

High Grade / HG (1:144) 
HG models were introduced in 1990. The original kits featured full snap-fit assembly, an articulated internal frame (for the first two kits, which provides better range of motion and is more poseable), and utilized the molding technique known as System Injection, wherein multiple colors would be cast on the same part. In 1999, the High Grade Universal Century Line was introduced, which collected mobile suits from the Universal Century Timeline. In 2010, the line was expanded to include mobile suits from Future Century, After Colony, After War, Correct Century, and Cosmic Era, and Gundam series that did not fit in those timeline (Like Gundam AGE or Iron Blooded Orphans) received their own HG lines. In 2015, HG Revive, a subline within the HGUC line was introduced, which gave older HGUC kits redesigns that adhered to modern HG standards in terms of detail and articulation. The High Grade line is not exclusive to Gundam, as other mecha series, such as Mazinger, Kyokai Senki, and Evangelion receiving HG kits of their own. HG Amplified IMGN was a subline introduced in 2022, which redesigned smaller robots with more humanoid proportions.

Master Grade / MG (1:100) 
MG models were first introduced in the summer of 1995, designed and made to higher standards than most other models. These kits take longer to construct and are often more expensive than their lower-grade counterparts. More recent Master Grade plastic models typically feature a movable inner frame system which enables extensive movement and bending of joints, as well as including standing and seating miniature figures of the pilots of each Gundam model.

Beginning in 2005 with the Zeta Gundam and Gundam Mk-II, Older MG Kits would be redesigned under the Ver.2.0 moniker with features such as improved articulation and a full inner frame. The RX-78-2 Gundam has had multiple MG iterations, including a Ver.1.5 that uses a mix of old and new parts, a Ver.2.0 that is more faithful to the original anime, a Ver.3.0 that is modeled after the life size statue similar to the Real Grade version, and a version based on its appearance in Gundam The Origin. There is also a Ver.Ka and Ver.OYW (One Year War).

The Master Grade line is not Gundam exclusive as a few Master Grade offerings have come from mechas in Patlabor and Dunbine. Bandai also released a line featuring a series of character figures from Dragon Ball Z, Kamen Rider, and Tiger & Bunny under the name of MG Figurerise.

In 2002, a new line of Master Grade kits subtitled "Ver. Ka" was released, which are Master Grades designed by mecha designer Hajime Katoki. Mobile suits chosen to become Ver. Ka kits are chosen by annual fan votes. In 2020 a new line, Master Grade Extreme (abbreviated as MGEX) were redesigns of Master Grades that contained additional gimmicks called "Extreme Points". The first model kit of this line, the Unicorn Gundam Ver. Ka, contained an LED light strip that ran across the mobile suit. A second, the Strike Freedom released in November 2022 and uses metallic coated and plated parts for the inner frame.

Real Grade / RG (1:144) 
In 2010, Real Grade (RG) was released to celebrate the 30th anniversary of Gunpla. Real Grade kits are differentiated from HG kits by a number of features previously found only in larger scale kits, including near perfect color accuracy without the use of color-correcting stickers, a full inner frame, high part counts, advanced articulation, and extensive decals. These kits have also been redesigned to appear more "realistic" by adding additional surface detail, color separation and mechanical detail. Most RG kits use a technology called the Advanced MS Joint, where the inner frame for the chest, arms, legs, and feet are prebuilt and fully articulated, requiring the other parts to be attached to it. Later RG kits have used the MS Joint more sparingly, limiting its use to accessories or specific limbs.

Perfect Grade / PG (1:60) 
PG is the highest grade line of Bandai kits. The first PG Gunpla kit was a RX 78-2 Gundam model released in 1998, but an Evangelion Unit-01 kit labeled as Perfect Grade released the year prior. Only 19 kits have been released as 1/60 Perfect Grade since then. A Perfect Grade Millennium Falcon kit released in 2017 and was 1/72 scale instead of 1/60 scale. The first PG Unleashed kit was a RX 78-2 Gundam model released in December 2020.

As the name suggests, Perfect Grade gunpla kits attempt to represent the Gundam as perfectly as possible within real world and design limitations. These limitations result in the Perfect Grade line sometimes taking several years between releases to wait for advances in model making technology. Perfect Grade Unleashed is an updated version of Perfect Grade that uses more advanced technology and concepts, such as the return of Advanced MS Joints, the use of LEDs and Metallic stickers, multiple points of articulation in the same limb, and the Evolution Link System, where the construction is separated into multiple phases (starts with the bare inner frame, then the extra detail within the frame with metallic parts, then the armor attached to the frame) to simulate building a real mecha, with the final phase displaying the detail of the inner frame using multiple hatches.

Features like metal joints, increased detail in plastic molding and plastic quality, as well as LED lighting kits are signatures of the PG line.

Other lines

Super Deformed / SD 
Not based on any particular scale, the super-deformed style features comically proportioned models, the most noticeable features of which are their very large heads. Super Deformed Gundam kits are often very easy to construct but offer very limited articulation and require paint and detailing.

The most famous line is BB Senshi (or "SD GUNDAM BB Warriors" in English), which ran from 1987 to 2018. Various other SD gundam lines have run alongside and replaced it, including:

 SD G Generation (1999-2002), based on the game series of the same name.
 SD EX-Standard (2015-2017, 2020-), which are produced in China and are the current replacement for the previous lines. SDEX kits have a gimmick where the accessories can be combined and used with most HG kits.
 SD Cross Silhouette (2018-2020, 2023-), which uses a simple inner frame for better articulation.
 SD Gundam World Sangoku Soketsuden and SD Gundam World Heroes (2019-2020, 2021-), based on their corresponding series.
 Master Grade SD (2023), an upcoming line that would be similar to a Master Grade in terms of detail and articulation, while still keeping the Super Deformed Designs.

Entry Grade (EG) 
In 2011, Bandai released the Entry Grade (EG) line in Southeast Asia. Originally manufactured in China, the EG line contained fewer parts than the FG kits, thus having very limited articulation. Only four Gundams were released in the line. Bandai later rebooted the Entry Grade line in 2020 to be released worldwide. While most releases were static figurines from other franchises, the RX-78-2 Gundam was the starting Gundam model, with the kit having articulation and proportions similar to the High Grade kits and advanced color separated parts without the need of stickers (for example, the silhouette in the eye that would normally be a sticker is done through shadow).

Mega Size Model / MSM (1:48)
Bandai released the 1:48 Mega Size Model (MSM) line in 2010 to commemorate the 30th anniversary of Mobile Suit Gundam. 6 suits were released:

 RX-78-2 Gundam
 MS-06C Zaku II
 MS-06S Char's Zaku II
 Gundam AGE-1 Normal
 Gundam AGE-2
 Unicorn Gundam Destroy Mode (released in 2017)

These kits are similar in build quality to their 1:144 HGUC counterparts, but priced much lower than the 1:60 Perfect Grade line. Once assembled, these models stand 37.5 cm tall (about 15 inches), 3 times the size of a 1/144 kit.

Bandai developed these kits with ease of build in mind as they require no tools to build. The individual pieces are attached to the runner by a very thin piece of plastic so that they can be broken off by hand or by a parts separator. The assembly process can be sped up even more as the runners have been developed in a way so that you can attach two together and break off the individual pieces that way. Bandai also included a 'Double Separator' tool to help with the new method of building.

UC HardGraph 
The Universal Century HardGraph line is 1/35 scale and centers on military scenes on a more conventional scale such as land vehicles, tanks and troops. However, some kits do include detailed to-scale mecha parts which are particularly useful for the creation of dioramas. For instance, the Anti-MS Squad kit includes an articulated lower Gundam/GM arm. The High Grade UC Hardgraph subline includes 1/144 scale vehicles as well as a full mecha

Other/Mixed Scales
Iropla was released in 1983 as a budget line. 4 kits were released in 1/250 scale and it was the first to use multi-colored runners for better color separation.

Haropla is a line of model kits based on Haro, a robot helper that appears in various Gundam timelines.

Speed Grade uses a scale of 1:200 and had parts prepainted on the runners.

Advanced Grade, released to coincide with Gundam AGE, had limited articulation (restricted to the head and shoulders) and came with microchips and trading cards for use with a Gundam AGE arcade game.

A 1:400 scale model line is designed for large mobile armours and battle ships in the Gundam Collection line, which the line's ordinary mobile suits as figures, not models. Only extremely large units like Mobile Armours and Warships need assembly. These are pre-coloured models, and the warships need minimal assembly.

An earlier line of model, the High Grade Mechanics, with a scale of 1:550 held a similar function in introducing large mobile units, but the line only consisted of 3 mobile units from 0083.

Another high-detail line is the EX model, in scales of 1:144 and 1:100 (non-humanoid units like aircraft) and 1:1600/1:1700 (spaceships), ranging from the Universal Century to Cosmic Era productions. This series is not Gundam-exclusive, having models from other series like some of the jet aircraft from Sentō Yōsei Yukikaze and at least one aircraft from Ace Combat 5.

HI-Resolution Models are 1/100 scale and, in addition to redesigning the mobile suit, included a pre-built inner frame similar to an action figure.

Hyper Hybrid Models (HY2Ms) include Gundam heads modified to incoorperate LED units or 1/60 scale models that have LED units across the body and require knowledge on electronics to make.

Reborn 1/100 kits are 1/100 scale and cover more obscure mobile suits and those that would be too large to make into a standard MG model. As such, these kits are less complicated than a typical MG kit.

1/100 Full Mechanics kits are less intricate 1/100 scale models separate from the Master Grade line. This was introduced in 2016 for the second season of Iron Blooded Orphans.

Bandai's line of Action Figure Model Kits, Figure Rise Standard, has few releases based on human characters in various Gundam series, most recently Suletta Mercury from the series Mobile Suit Gundam: The Witch From Mercury.

Action Bases are display bases that allow a Gundam model to be displayed in mid-air poses. 6 variations of the Action Base, meant for 1/144 scale, 1/100 scale, and SD kits have been released since 2006, and some models will have an action base included, although it is uncommon

Hobby 
Gundam model building as a hobby is a worldwide phenomenon. Participation ranges from simply assembling kits as sold, to mild personalization with paint and decals, to creating nearly original works with parts from multiple kits, additional custom-made components and in-depth, highly detailed multi-layer paint jobs.

Like any hobby, gunpla building can be extremely involved and expensive, but with model kits starting at less than US$20 and requiring no special tools or materials, barrier to entry is low.

Some hobbyists build dioramas around finished models using techniques shared with other miniature model-based hobbies such as model railroading and wargaming. A diorama could depict a mecha in combat, undergoing maintenance or even destroyed on the battlefield.

Bandai holds an annual international contest, Gunpla Builders World Cup, in at least 16 countries. Winners are awarded trophies and model kits.

Model series 
Gundam models are divided into series according to the media they're derived from.

Since 1999, the High Grade series uses various names to separate them from line to line.

 High Grade Universal Century (HGUC) refers to units that appear from Mobile Suit Gundam to Mobile Suit Victory Gundam and the series that are released in between. In 2010, this was expanded to include other series, under the lines:
 High Grade After Colony (HGAC)
 High Grade After War (HGAW)
 High Grade Future Century (HGFC)
 High Grade Correct Century (HGCC)
 High Grade Cosmic Era (HGCE)
 Models from Mobile Suit Gundam SEED/Mobile Suit Gundam SEED Destiny, Mobile Suit Gundam 00, as well as from any Gundam series that released after 2010 released under these sublines:
 High Grade Gundam SEED (HG Gundam SEED)
 High Grade Gundam 00 (HG Gundam 00)
 High Grade Gundam AGE (HG Gundam AGE)
 High Grade Reconguista in G (HG Reconguista in G)
 High Grade Gundam Thunderbolt (HGGT)
 High Grade The Origin (HG The Origin)
 High Grade Iron Blooded Orphans (HGIBO)
 High Grade The Witch From Mercury (HGTWFM)
 Four sub lines were also introduced to celebrate the release of Gundam Build Fighters, Gundam Build Fighters Try, Gundam Build Divers and Gundam Build Divers Re:Rise:
 High Grade Build Fighters (HGBF)
 High Grade Build Custom (HGBC)
 High Grade Build Divers (HGBD)
High Grade Build Divers Re:RISE (HGBD:R)

Gundam FIX Figuration
The Gundam FIX Figuration (aka G.F.F.) series of collectible figures was started based on the Gundam mechanical designs of Hajime Katoki and his 'Gundam FIX' illustration artbook and are released by Tamashii Nations, a Bandai's characters based toys line. These figures share similar features as those found in the MSiA series, but are considerably more detailed and often include more accessories.

Changeable parts and variant models are often utilized throughout the line, offering the collector a wide variety of display abilities. The collectible figures use PVC (with some ABS plastic) for construction materials, and a recently introduced expansion to the line use metal in the skeleton of the figure. Gundam FIX figures are designed to be true to Hajime Katoki's vision, and as such often adopt design elements and styling found throughout his artwork. The Fix series caters to Gundam fans who enjoy the scale, possibility and durability of the MSiA line, but seek the extensive details and variations that can often only be found in the Master Grade Gundam model-kits.

The G.F.F. line does carry a higher price than the MSIA and MSIA Extended lines, which can represent a concern for some collectors. However, overall the G.F.F. represent a more "high-end" line of collectibles, which often contain better detail, more accessories, and the option to build multiple variations in the same box.

As the series has progressed, G.F.F. collectibles have been improved. Changes include sharper-more precise part casting resulting in better detail, improved articulation, and improved durability.

G.F.F.N.
The G.F.F.N. line up is a significantly better than the old G.F.F. series, though usually sporting a considerably higher price due to materials, production and shipping. The quality has improved thanks to a new durable plastic that is distinctively reminiscent to the Gundam Model plastic (HG, HGUC, MG, PG) thus replacing the resin that shrank while curing. There is also little, or no casting lines, professionally cast heads, and considerably less of the brittle gray-ish plastic that plagued the G.F.F. series. Rubber is now being used sparsely, often to be used for the hands to allow ease of swapping weapons or spare hands without breaking or warping the joint socket.

There are very few toys in the line-up, with some costing between $70–$150 or more (the price of a Perfect Grade, or large Master Grade.)

Bandai also created similar toy lines:
 G.F.F. Metal Composite - a spin-off of the G.F.F series utilizing injection-molded ABS plastic and die-cast metal.
 Zeonography - a spin-off of the G.F.F series that showcases mobile suits from the Zeon forces.
 Cosmic Region - high-quality line of mobile suits, similar to G.F.F., that appear in Mobile Suit Gundam SEED Destiny.
 00 (Double O) Region - high-quality line of mobile suits, similar to G.F.F., that appear in Mobile Suit Gundam 00.
 G.F.F.N - Gundam Fix Figuration Next, '004X' Series utilizing metallic parts, slightly larger scale, better quality paint job and markings. The first figure is a re-release of the #0030 MSZ-008 Zeta II, released March 2009.
 K.F.F (Keroro Fix Figuration) - a spinoff lines features characters in Sgt. Frog (which the series itself plays much parody towards Gundam series) with original mechas designed by Hajime Katoki. As being a parody, the boxart sticks as much what as the original G.F.F. is.

Special editions
Over the years, Bandai releases special limited editions of various kits, usually as competition (such as the yearly Bandai Action Kits Asia (now Universal) Cup held in Hong Kong) prizes, or as an event-limited (such as Japanese toy expos, movie launch premieres) item, although sometimes these kits are sold as limited web-shop items or discreetly sold by Bandai.

These kits usually come in clear plastic, metal-plated (certain kits are in so-called 24-k gold finish), "gloss-finish", "pearl-finish", "titanium-finish", or any combination of these. Their prices are usually much higher than their regular-release counterparts.

Display-only models
For trade shows and toy fairs, Bandai displays some extremely large models in 1:6 or 1:12 scale. True to the scaling, some of these models are well over 5 feet (1.50 m) tall.

Although most of these are one off promotional models used for display purposes, Bandai has produced a few of these for commercial purposes under their HY2M line. Notably, these are MS-06S "Zaku II  Commander Type" (Char Aznable custom), which is now out of production, and the RX-78-2 "Gundam". These generally retail for approximately $2,000 and are intended to be sold primarily to store owners as display fronts.

As part of the 30th Anniversary of the Gundam series, the company officially announced a project on March 11, 2009, called Real-G planning to build a 1:1 real size scale Gundam in Japan, it was completed on June 9, 2009, and displayed in a Tokyo park. The 18-meter tall statue was later moved and reconstructed in Shizuoka City, where it stayed from July 2010 to March 2011 when in August it was dismantled only to reopen in Odaiba, Tokyo on April 19, 2012. It stood in front of a gift shop, "Gundam Front Tokyo", until 2017 when it was replaced by the titular mobile suit of Mobile Suit Gundam Unicorn.

Chinese copy controversy
In April 2010, Bandai sued two Chinese toy manufacturers for manufacturing and selling counterfeit Gunpla kits. The lawsuit states that Bandai demands 3.69 million RMB (roughly US$540,000) compensation from the companies.

Bootleg Gunpla companies include Daban, TT Hongli, Model GD, Elyn Hobby, and Dragon Momoko.

In popular culture
 Four Gundam Media series titles focus primarily on Gunpla kits: Plamo Kyo-Shiro (1982), Model Suit Gunpla Builders Beginning G (2010), and Gundam Build Fighters (2013) and its sequel Gundam Build Fighters Try (2014) and later the spiritual successor Gundam Build Divers (2018) as well as its sequel series, Gundam Build Divers Re:Rise (2019-2020).
 In the manga/anime series Sgt. Frog, an addiction to Gundam models is the only thing stopping Keroro from invading Earth, since he reasons that if the Keronians invade Earth, all of the Gundam models will be destroyed, and there will be no one to make new ones. He loves the models so much, if any harm comes to them, he will react violently (such as going Super Saiyan). He is prepared for such events, though, since he keeps spare kits in the Hinata family's attic. Because the anime is made by Sunrise (the makers of the Gundam anime), and because Bandai is the show's primary sponsor, the show is able to refer to Gundam models directly without legal issues.
In the manga/anime series Genshiken, Soichiro Tanaka teaches Kanako Ohno and Kanji Sasahara how to build Gundam models in Chapter 13 (adapted as episode 8 of the anime, where the pseudonym "Gungal" is used). Saki Kasukabe accidentally breaks Ohno's model and has to make it up to her by doing cosplay.

See also
Gundam
Mobile Suit Gundam
Gundam (fictional robot)

Notes

References

External links
Bandai Hobby Site 
Bandai Hobby Site 
Bandai Action Kits Universal Cup (BAKUC) Online Competition 
Tamashii Web  - Official Gundam fix figuration series website.

Products introduced in 1980
1980s toys
1990s toys
2000s toys
2010s toys
Bandai brands
Collecting
Gundam
Scale modeling
Toy mecha